Topador is a populated centre in the north of the Artigas Department of northern Uruguay, near the borders with Brazil.

Geography

Population
In 2011 Topador had a population of 124.
 
Source: Instituto Nacional de Estadística de Uruguay

References

External links
INE map of Topador

Populated places in the Artigas Department